Baileysville  is an unincorporated community in Wyoming County, West Virginia, United States.  Most of the town was purchased by the United States Army Corps of Engineers in the 1960s and 1970s for construction of the R. D. Bailey Lake.  The Post Office was closed in 1973.  The geographic name lived on in the local high school, Baileysville High School, which served a regional area and was actually located outside of the town proper.  The school was closed in 2002 after consolidating with nearby Oceana High to form Westside High School.

The community has the name of James Bailey, Sr., a local pioneer.

References

Unincorporated communities in West Virginia
Unincorporated communities in Wyoming County, West Virginia
Populated places on the Guyandotte River